Head First is an Australian documentary television series which premiered on ABC2 from 1 May 2013. It is presented by Sabour Bradley. The series focuses on controversial topics in Australian society such as transgender issues, stem cell research, the porn industry, and rhino poaching in Africa. The second season of the show aired on ABC1 from 16 July 2014. The series was a critical success. Ratings for the fourth episode of season 1 were the highest overnight figures for an ABC2-commissioned show ever. Reruns air on both ABC2 and ABC1.

References

External links

Australian Broadcasting Corporation original programming
2010s Australian documentary television series
2013 Australian television series debuts